Terence Koh (born 1977 in Beijing, China ) is a Canadian artist who has also worked under the alias "asianpunkboy". The artist's work spans a range of media, including drawing, sculpture, video, performance, and the internet. Originally working under the alias asianpunkboy, Koh designed zines and custom-made books. His recent work has expanded to include durational performances, complex installations, and the exploration of natural ecosystems. Much of his diverse work involves queer, punk, and pornographic sensibilities. In 2008, he was listed in Out magazine's "Out 100 People of the Year".

Early life and education
Koh was raised in Mississauga, Ontario, and now lives in Northern California. He is a Chinese-Canadian artist who received degrees from the Emily Carr Institute of Art and Design, Vancouver and The University of Waterloo, Ontario.

Career

Koh's work was included in the Whitney Biennial (2004), and the Yokohama Triennial (2008). In 2008, he was a finalist for the Sobey Award. His work was the subject of solo exhibitions at MUSAC, León, Spain (2008); Schirn Kunsthalle, Frankfurt, Germany (2008); the Whitney Museum of American Art, New York (2007); Kunsthalle Zürich, Switzerland (2006); and the Vienna Secession, Austria (2005). His work is in the permanent collections of institutions such as the Museum of Modern Art, New York; the Whitney Museum of American Art, New York; and the Tate Modern, London, UK.

Koh's work has been associated with New Gothic Art. In nothingtoodoo, his first solo show at the Mary Boone Gallery, Koh, "dressed in white pajamalike clothes, slowly circl[es] a beautiful cone-shaped pile of rocky solar salt — 8 feet high and 24 feet across — on his knees." So Roberta Smith described the work in an appreciative March 2011, review. "This is performance art reduced to a bare and relentless rite in a space that has been stripped down to a kind of temple. (Its regal proportions help.) ... Maybe the work is an extended apology for past bad-boy behavior." In 2008 he created the Terence Koh Show on YouTube, in which visitors to his home are either interviewed by Koh, or interview Koh themselves. Each show is usually not more than a few minutes in length. Some episodes are more abstract, such as when he plays the video forward but edits the sound to play backwards. Notable guests have included Marina Abramović, Hans Ulrich Obrist, and most recently, Lady Gaga. In the clip with Lady Gaga titled "88 pearls", Koh counts a bowl of pearls with Lady Gaga, who is wearing a costume inspired by Koh's sculpture from his project Boy By The Sea. Koh's affiliation with the pop star began at the 2010 Grammys, where Lady Gaga performed on a piano designed by Koh specifically for the occasion. In the tradition of Piero Manzoni, Koh has gold-plated and sold his own feces for a total of $500,000.00 to collectors.

References

External links
 Moran Bondaroff: Terence Koh
 Saatchi Gallery: Terence Koh
 Koh Birdy – Terence Koh Project
 New York magazine article (01/2007)
 LA Times article (05/2008)
 Times article (01/2008)

1977 births
Living people
Canadian people of Chinese descent
Canadian video artists
Canadian contemporary artists
21st-century Canadian sculptors
Canadian male sculptors
21st-century Canadian male artists
Emily Carr University of Art and Design alumni
Canadian gay artists
Canadian performance artists
21st-century Canadian LGBT people